Welcome Air, officially Welcome Air Luftfahrt GmbH & Co KG, was an Austrian charter airline with its head office in Innsbruck.

History
On 14 June 1995 Jakob Ringler, since 1983 one of the directors of Tyrolean Air Ambulance (founded 1963 as Aircraft Innsbruck), founded Welcome Air Luftfahrt GmbH.

Through a management buy out in 2000 Tyrolean Air Ambulance (renamed then Tyrol Air Ambulance), which had closely links to the local airline Tyrolean Airways as well as to the helicopter company "Heliair" (formerly "Aircraft Innsbruck"), became part of Jakob Ringler's "Welcome Air" after he took over the majority (in 2011 93,27% belonging to Welcome Air). On 22 May 2000 Welcome Air started its first flight with Do-328 from Innsbruck to Graz.

In 2009 Welcome Air was taken over by Lions Air Group (Switzerland) which also taken over the majority of Air Alps. The umbrella company Welcome Aviation Group set up to merge the companies Tyrol Air Ambulance, Air Alps and Welcome Air and their head offices into one in Innsbruck.

In July 2011 Welcome Aviation Group announced a restructure and therefore Welcome Air will concentrate its activities on business & event charters and will end the year-round Innsbruck - Graz service, but continue the summer operations to Innsbruck/Graz-Olbia and Innsbruck-Nice for a while. Air Alps, which meanwhile ceased operations, concentrated its activities on the Italian schedule operations back then and Tyrol Air Ambulance on its ambulance operations. Meanwhile, Welcome Air ceased all remaining scheduled operations and concentrates entirely on offering European charter services.

In February 2015, Austrian Airlines announced the termination of their wetlease contract with Welcome Air for their Vienna - Linz flights from 31 March 2015. Austrian Airlines had started an airport rail link from Linz to Vienna only months before which was well received, resulting in the five daily flights reduction. Welcome Air subsequently announced a reduction in the fleet size.

On 26 December 2017, Welcome Air operated its last flight, a charter service from Antwerp to Innsbruck, and ceased all operations the day after, marking the end of the airline. The last Dornier 328 aircraft was placed up for sale after its former sister aircraft had already been moved to new operators. Its former subcompany, air rescue and charter service Tyrol Air Ambulance, will continue its operations and added another aircraft to compensate for the closure of Welcome Air.

Destinations

The airline served the scheduled destinations listed below before concentrating on charter operations.

Austria
Graz - Graz Airport
Innsbruck - Innsbruck Airport base

Belgium
Antwerp - Antwerp Airport

Croatia
Rijeka - Rijeka Airport seasonal

France
Nice - Nice Côte d'Azur Airport seasonal

Germany
Hannover - Hannover Airport

Italy
Olbia - Olbia - Costa Smeralda Airport seasonal

Netherlands
Rotterdam/The Hague - Rotterdam The Hague Airport

Norway
Kristiansand - Kristiansand Airport
Stavanger - Stavanger Airport

Sweden
 Gothenburg - Göteborg Landvetter Airport

Fleet
Welcome Air operated the following aircraft during its existence between 2000 and 2017:

3 Dornier 328
2 Fairchild Dornier 328JET

References

External links

Defunct airlines of Austria
Airlines established in 2000
Airlines disestablished in 2017
2017 disestablishments in Austria
European Regions Airline Association
Austrian companies established in 2000